Drum Suite is an album by drummer Art Blakey with The Jazz Messengers and the Art Blakey Percussion Ensemble, recorded in late 1956 and early 1957 and originally released on the Columbia label. It was the first of several albums recorded by Blakey in the 1950s and 1960s that explored percussion-oriented jazz. It was followed by Orgy in Rhythm, Holiday for Skins, and The African Beat.

The 2005 CD reissue added three tracks from a June 1956 session, two of them previously released on Originally in 1982.

Reception

Allmusic awarded the album 4 stars, calling it "Groundbreaking for its time, and still sounding vital, powerful, and visionary, the Drum Suite album is somewhat of a lost masterpiece that deserves a fresh audience".

Track listing 
 "The Sacrifice" (Art Blakey) - 5:16    
 "Cubano Chant" (Ray Bryant) - 4:01    
 "Oscalypso" (Oscar Pettiford) - 8:48    
 "Nica's Tempo" (Gigi Gryce) - 8:24    
 "D's Dilemma" (Mal Waldron) - 8:32    
 "Just for Marty" (Bill Hardman) - 5:56

Bonus tracks on 2005 Legacy CD:
"Lil' T (a.k.a. The Third)" - 8:12
"The New Message (a.k.a. Little T)" (Take 1) - 8:39
"The New Message (a.k.a. Little T)" (Take 3) - 5:32

Personnel 
Art Blakey - drums
Bill Hardman (4–6), Donald Byrd (7–9) - trumpet
Jackie McLean - alto saxophone (tracks 4–6)
Ira Sullivan - tenor saxophone (7–9) 
Ray Bryant (tracks 1–3), Sam Dockery (tracks 4–6), Kenny Drew (7–9) - piano
Oscar Pettiford - bass, cello (tracks 1–3)
Spanky DeBrest (tracks 4–6), Wilbur Ware (tracks 7–9) - bass
Jo Jones - drums (tracks 1–3)
Charles "Specs" Wright - drums, timpani, gong (tracks 1–3)
Candido Camero, Sabu Martinez - bongos (tracks 1–3)

References 

Art Blakey albums
The Jazz Messengers albums
1957 albums
Columbia Records albums
Albums produced by George Avakian